Emer Currie (born 1 May 1979) is an Irish Fine Gael politician who has served as a Senator since June 2020, after being nominated by the Taoiseach.

She previously served as a member of Fingal County Council from 2019 to 2020.

Currie was an unsuccessful candidate in the 2020 general election as the Fine Gael running mate of outgoing Taoiseach Leo Varadkar in Dublin West.

Her father, Austin Currie, was a founding member of the SDLP, former Minister of State, and Teachta Dála (TD).

References

External links
Emer Currie's page on the Fine Gael website

1979 births
Living people
Fine Gael senators
Members of the 26th Seanad
Nominated members of Seanad Éireann
Politicians from County Tyrone
21st-century women members of Seanad Éireann